Lionel Bringuier (born 24 September 1986, Nice, is a French conductor, cellist and pianist.

Bringuier is the fourth child in a family of musicians, including his brother Nicolas Bringuier, a pianist.  At age 5, Bringuier began musical studies at the Nice conservatory, where he won several first prizes.  At age 13, in February 2000, he was admitted to the Conservatoire national supérieur de musique et de danse de Paris, where he continued his studies in cello and in conducting.  His teachers there have included Philippe Muller.  At the Conservatoire de Paris, he then began conducting studies, where his teachers included Zsolt Nagy.  Bringuier graduated cum laude from the Conservatoire de Paris with diplomas in cello studies and conducting in June 2004.  Bringuier has performed in a cello-piano duo with his brother Nicolas.

In 2005, Bringuier became assistant conductor with the Ensemble orchestral de Paris.  That same year, he won the 49th International Besançon Competition for Young Conductors.  In 2007, Bringuier became associate conductor of the Orchestre National de Bretagne. In the US, Bringuier took up the post of assistant conductor of the Los Angeles Philharmonic in 2007, appointed by Esa-Pekka Salonen.  During the subsequent music directorship of Gustavo Dudamel, Bringuier was promoted to associate conductor, and later, to resident conductor (the first person to hold this title in the orchestra's history).  He stood down from this post after the 2012-2013 season.

From 2009 to 2012, Bringuier was Music Director of the Orquesta Sinfónica de Castilla y León (Valladolid, Spain).  Bringuier first guest-conducted the Tonhalle-Orchester Zürich in November 2011, and returned in June 2012.  In October 2012, the Tonhalle-Orchester Zürich named Bringuier as its next chief conductor and music director, as of the 2014-2015 season, with an initial contract of 4 years.  In August 2016, the orchestra announced that Bringuier is to conclude his tenure with the Tonhalle Orchestra at the end of his current contract, at the end of the 2017-2018 season.

Bringuier has made commercial recordings of music of Vincent D'Indy with the Orchestre de Bretagne for the Timpani Records label, and of music of Camille Saint-Saëns with the Orchestre Philharmonique de Radio France for the Erato label.

References

External links
 Official Lionel Bringuier homepage
 'CK Dexter Haven', 'Five concerts, four conductors at different stages of their relationship w/ the LA Phil (part 2 of 4): Lionel Bringuier and the latest Green Umbrella new music concert'.  All Is Yar blog, 11 December 2012
 'CK Dexter Haven', 'A chat with Lionel Bringuier about the LA Phil and the Tonhalle, Pierre Boulez and Esa-Pekka Salonen, Yuja Wang and Kanye West, and more'.  All Is Yar blog, 20 November 2015

French male conductors (music)
21st-century French male classical pianists
French classical cellists
Conservatoire de Paris alumni
People from Nice
Living people
1986 births
21st-century French conductors (music)
21st-century cellists